Levoverbenone is an expectorant.  It is the L-isomer of verbenone.

References

External links 
 

Antitussives
Enones
Enantiopure drugs
Monoterpenes
Cycloalkenes